Hailman is a surname. Notable people with this surname include:

Jack Hailman (1936–2016), American zoologist and ethologist
Johanna Woodwell Hailman (1871–1958), American painter

See also
Heilman